Battersea Library is a Grade II listed building at Altenburg Gardens, Battersea, London, SW11 1JB.

Battersea Library was built in 1924, and the architect was Henry Hyams.

The reference library is connected to Battersea Central Library.

References

Grade II listed buildings in the London Borough of Wandsworth
Grade II listed library buildings